Lawrence Henry Framme III (born October 8, 1949) is an American attorney who twice served as chair of the Democratic Party of Virginia. 

He was elected to his first term at the age of 37, after which he was selected by Governor Douglas Wilder to serve as state Secretary of Commerce (then called Secretary of Economic Development). In 2000, Framme ran alongside state senator Emily Couric for the respective positions of State Chair and General Chair; the positions were created after Couric was diagnosed with pancreatic cancer and suspended her run for lieutenant governor.

References

External links
 Democratic Party of Virginia

Living people
State cabinet secretaries of Virginia
Washington and Lee University School of Law alumni
Centre College alumni
1949 births